The monument to Rafael Cabrera is installed in the city of Puebla, in the Mexican state of Puebla.

References

External links

 

Busts in Mexico
Monuments and memorials in Puebla
Outdoor sculptures in Puebla (city)
Sculptures of men in Mexico